The 1969 South Pacific Games, held from 13–23 August 1969 at Port Moresby in Papua New Guinea, was the third edition of the South Pacific Games. A total of 1,150 athletes participated in the games.

Participating countries
Twelve Pacific nations or territories competed at the Games:

Note: A number in parentheses indicates the size of a country's team (where known).

Sports
There were fifteen sports contested at the 1969 South Pacific Games:

Note: Numbers in parentheses indicate the number of medal events contested in each sport (where known).

Final medal table

Notes
 A total of fifteen sports were contested at the 1969 South Pacific Games. Athletics (and the opening and closing ceremonies) were held at the newly built Sir Hubert Murray Stadium at Konedobu. The souvenir programme for 1969 features the official games logo and icons for the fifteen sports.

 Basketball, tennis, table tennis, boxing, swimming, athletics, rugby union, soccer and golf were played at the 1969 games.

 Golf: There were individual and team sections for men and for women; four medal events in total. The tournament was played at Lae.

 Judo was included in the SPG for the first time in 1969. Participants came from Fiji, French Polynesia, Guam, New Caledonia, New Hebrides, Tonga, and Papua New Guinea. One competitor per country was allowed in each of five weight divisions: lightweight, light middleweight, middleweight, light heavyweight, heavyweight.

 Netball was played at the 1969 Games, but PNG was given a prize instead of the gold medal as only two teams entered the competition.

 Yachting (Fireball dinghy), volleyball, and softball were played at the 1969 games.

 Weightlifting, yachting and boxing are depicted on postage stamps celebrating the 1969 games.

References

Sources

Pacific Games by year
Pacific Games
Pacific Games
 
1969 in Papua New Guinean sport
International sports competitions hosted by Papua New Guinea
August 1969 sports events in Oceania
Port Moresby